Georg Hegner (24 June 1897 – 17 February 1985) was a Danish épée and foil fencer. He competed in four events at the 1920 Summer Olympics.

References

1897 births
1985 deaths
Danish male épée fencers
Olympic fencers of Denmark
Fencers at the 1920 Summer Olympics
Sportspeople from Copenhagen
Danish male foil fencers